Wyoming Highway 319 (WYO 319) is a  north-south state road in Platte and Converse counties.

Route description
Wyoming Highway 319 is a north–south highway that follows the old Yellowstone Highway, therefore the current highway is named Old Yellowstone Highway. WYO 319 begins its south end at I-25 (exit 100) and from there heads northeast then north towards Glendo. At  WYO 319 intersects a local road which heads west to exit 104 off I-25. As Highway 319 leaves Glendo, at  there is a road named Lake Shore Road that east of WYO 319 and allows access to Glendo State Park. Glendo State Park is one of Wyoming's most popular boating parks, and it offers visitors water-skiing, fishing, and other water-based activities as well as campsites, sanitary facilities, tables and grills.
Wyoming Highway 319 heads northwest and parallels Interstate 25 that lies to the west and the Glendo Reservoir/North Platte River that lies to the east.

History
Wyoming Highway 319 is the original alignment of Old US 185 between 1926 and 1936. and US 87 (Yellowstone Highway) from 1936 until Interstate 25 was completed (between 1956 and the 1980s) and therefore routed along it.

Major intersections

Wyoming Highway 319 Spur

Wyoming Highway 319 Spur runs from WYO 319 west to Interstate 25/US 87 (exit 111) at the Glendo Interchange.

References

Official 2003 State Highway Map of Wyoming

External links 

Wyoming State Routes
WYO 319 - I-25/US 26/US 87 to WYO 319 Spur
WYO 319 - WYO 319 Spur to US 18/US 20
WYO 319 Spur - I-25 to WYO 319
Town of Glendo, WY website
WY State Parks - Glendo State Park

Transportation in Converse County, Wyoming
Transportation in Platte County, Wyoming
319